Enrique Gil Calderón (Guayaquil, May 14, 1935 - Guayaquil, December 11, 2008) was an Ecuadorian choral director. He was the son of the novelist Enrique Gil Gilbert and the painter Alba Calderón Zatizábal.

He had a daughter with soprano Beatriz Parra, who also trained in Russia to perform lyrical music Beatriz Gil Parra

Gil Calderón was awarded the Premio Eugenio Espejo in 2008 by the Ecuadorian President Rafael Correa (2007–Present) after he rejected the prize in 1995 from President Sixto Duran Ballen (1992-1996).

Gil Calderón, known as Kily by his friends, died of Leukemia in 2008.

1935 births
2008 deaths
People from Guayaquil
Deaths from cancer in Ecuador
Deaths from leukemia